Reyvissche Castle is a castle in Zwijnaarde Belgium.

See also
List of castles in Belgium

References

Castles in Belgium
Castles in East Flanders
Ghent